Luis Abramovich (born 1962) is an Argentine former footballer. While playing for Boca Juniors he won many titles including the Recopa Sudamericana, Supercopa Sudamericana and the Supercopa Masters. He played a total of 200 games for Boca in all competitions, scoring 5 goals.

External links
 Luis Abramovich at BDFA.com.ar 

1962 births
Living people
Argentine footballers
Argentine people of Russian-Jewish descent
Association football defenders
Argentine Primera División players
Chacarita Juniors footballers
Boca Juniors footballers
Racing Club de Avellaneda footballers
Club Atlético Belgrano footballers